HMNZS Manawanui can refer to

  – the first diving tender of the New Zealand navy from 1953 to 1978
  – diving tender commissioned in 1988, decommissioned in 2018
  – Is the current Dive and Hydrographic ship of the Royal New Zealand Navy, commissioning in 2019.

Royal New Zealand Navy ship names